Thayat Kunjananthan, commonly known as K. Thayat (17 February 1927 – 4 December 2011) was an Indian writer of children's literature and plays in Malayalam–language. He has written 42 books and over a hundred radio plays. He was also a school teacher and has received various awards in the field of literature as well as central and state awards for excellence in teaching.

Biography
He was born on 17 February 1927 in Panniyannur near Tellicherry in the present-day Indian state of Kerala, as the son of Chandu Nambiar and Lakshmi Amma. His brother Thayat Sankaran was a famous writer and Thayat Balan was a social activist. He completed his education at Kunnummal Higher Elementary School, BEMP High School, Kathirur Govt. High School and Brennen College.

Prior to joining the teaching profession, he worked for a short time as a ticket seller in cinema theatres, as a clerk in the Sub-Registrar's Office, as a non-operator in a military camp, and as a clerk in the Madras General Hospital. He also worked in Calicut All India Radio station. After a few months of teaching at Punnassery UP School in Puthiyara, Calicut, and Lakshmivilasam LP School in Chokli, Kannur, he joined Panoor UP School in 1952. He retired from the service in 1982 when he was the headmaster of the same school. He died on December 4, 2011 at the age of 85.

Literary life
He has written 42 books which include story, poetry, drama, children's literature and essays. His first collection of stories was Puthenkani, published in 1951 . His first collection of poems, Palpathakal, was published in 1953. His Naam Changala Potticha Katha is an exciting story of many freedom fighters who sacrificed their lives for the liberation of India. He was instrumental in writing the book Swathanthrya Samaram Kuttikalkk (History of the Freedom Struggle for Children), published by the State Institute of Children's Literature. Thayat was also an excellent orator. Thayat also authored over a hundred radio plays. His Thottakkaran was the first play by a non-employee to be aired on All India Radio, Calicut.

List of works

 Children's literature
 Mela
 Naivedyam
 Palppathakal
 Nadukanichuram
 Mazha Mazha Thenmazha
 Viddiyude Swargam
 Yakshiyum Kathakalum
 Snehamanu Sakthi
 Oru Katha Parayoo Teacher
 Muthassi Parayatha Katha
 Naranathu Bhranthanum Valmikavum
 Tenaliyile Kochuraman

 Short story
 Puthankani
 Nilakkannukal

 History
 Naam Changala Potticha Katha
 January 30

 Translation
 Oliver Twist
 Huckleberry Finn
 Velichathilekk
 Oru Kuttiyude Athmakatha

 Play
 Thyagaseema
 Bahadur Shah
 Shurpanakha
 Manthara
 Akshatham
 Socrates
 Bhagat Singh
 Janani Janmabhumi
 Aa Vaathil Adaykkaruth

Awards
The following are some of the awards received by K. Thayat.
 Awards for literature
 1982: Cherukad Award - Katha Urangunna Vazhiyiloode
 1997: Kerala Sangeetha Nataka Akademi Award (Drama)
 2002: Kerala Sahitya Akademi Endowment - Chakravarthiye Urumbu Thinnunnu
 2006: C. G. Santhakumar Award - Overall contributionref name="Santhakumar Award">"സമഗ്ര സംഭാവന പുരസ്കാരം". Kerala State Institute of Children's Literature. Retrieved 15 January 2023.</ref>
 Kairali Children's Book Trust Award - Nadukanichuram
 Bombay Natakavedi Award - Bahadur Shah
 Abu Dhabi Sakthi Award - Bhagat Singh
 Kerala State Institute of Children's Literature Award - Oliver Twist

 Awards for excellence in teaching
 1975: Kerala State Award for Best Teacher
 1976: National Award for Best Teacher

References

 1927 births
 2011 deaths
 Indian children's writers
 Indian male short story writers
 Indian male dramatists and playwrights
 Malayalam-language writers
 Malayalam-language dramatists and playwrights
 Malayalam short story writers
 20th-century Indian dramatists and playwrights
 Dramatists and playwrights from Kerala
 Writers from Kerala
 People from Kannur district
 People from Thalassery
 Recipients of the Kerala Sahitya Akademi Award
Recipients of the Kerala Sangeetha Nataka Akademi Award